Chatchon Jairangsee (born on 19 May 1995) is a Thai professional footballer who plays as a centre-back for MOF Customs United in the Thai League 2.

References

External links
 https://int.soccerway.com/players/chatchon-jairangsee/536715/
 https://www.ballthai.com/11-%e0%b8%99%e0%b8%b1%e0%b8%81%e0%b9%80%e0%b8%95%e0%b8%b0%e0%b9%81%e0%b8%a5%e0%b8%b0%e0%b8%81%e0%b8%b8%e0%b8%99%e0%b8%8b%e0%b8%b7%e0%b8%ad%e0%b8%a2%e0%b8%ad%e0%b8%94%e0%b9%80%e0%b8%a2%e0%b8%b5-19/
 https://www.goal.com/th/%E0%B8%A5%E0%B8%B4%E0%B8%AA%E0%B8%95%E0%B9%8C/toyota-thai-league-best-xi-%E0%B8%9B%E0%B8%A3%E0%B8%B0%E0%B8%88%E0%B8%B3%E0%B8%AA%E0%B8%9B%E0%B8%94%E0%B8%B2%E0%B8%AB%E0%B8%97-12/1gq5o3ubccqlu1q4sjdkuacahy#pu42j69lymf81lpo04rf21erf
 https://www.smmsport.com/reader/article/9983
 https://www.thsport.com/news-23495.html
 https://www.thsport.com/news-21002.html
 https://www.goal.com/th/%E0%B8%82%E0%B9%88%E0%B8%B2%E0%B8%A7/%E0%B9%82%E0%B8%84%E0%B8%8A%E0%B9%82%E0%B8%A2%E0%B8%87%E0%B8%A7%E0%B8%B2%E0%B9%84%E0%B8%87-%E0%B8%8A%E0%B8%A2%E0%B8%99%E0%B8%B2%E0%B8%97%E0%B8%8A%E0%B8%87-2-%E0%B8%94%E0%B8%B2%E0%B8%A7%E0%B8%A3%E0%B8%87%E0%B8%99%E0%B8%B2%E0%B8%A5%E0%B8%99%E0%B9%84%E0%B8%9B%E0%B9%80%E0%B8%AD%E0%B9%80%E0%B8%8A%E0%B8%A2%E0%B8%99%E0%B9%80%E0%B8%81%E0%B8%A1%E0%B8%AA/1ccxtca0veugr1gw1ijgexo9u1

1995 births
Living people
Chatchon Jairangsee
Chatchon Jairangsee
Association football defenders
Chatchon Jairangsee
Chatchon Jairangsee
Chatchon Jairangsee